Emmerson Jordan (born 27 April 1959) is a Barbadian cricketer. He played in four first-class matches for the Barbados cricket team in 1988/89.

See also
 List of Barbadian representative cricketers

References

External links
 

1959 births
Living people
Barbadian cricketers
Barbados cricketers
People from Saint Peter, Barbados